Black Diamond is Buraka Som Sistema's second album which was released in 2008.  It was released in the United States on April 7, 2009.

Track listing
"Luanda - Lisboa" (feat. DJ Znobia) - 4:21
"Sound of Kuduro" (featuring DJ Znobia, M.I.A., Saborosa and Puto Prata) - 3:33
"Aqui para vocês" (feat. Deize Tigrona) - 4:12
"Kalemba (Wegue Wegue)" (feat. Pongolove) - 3:53
"Kurum" - 5:44
"IC19" - 4:20
"Tiroza" (feat. Bruno M) - 4:49
"General" - 4:04
"Yah!" (feat. Petty) - 3:33
"Skank & Move" (feat. Kano) - 3:57
"D.. D.. D.. D.. Jay" (feat. Petty) - 3:46
"New Africas Pt.1" - 1:52
"New Africas Pt.2" - 3:55

Chart positions

References

External links
 KUDURO HIKORE YOUTUBE CHANNEL channel dedicated to kuduro, find there some singles of this album.

2008 albums
Buraka Som Sistema albums
European Border Breakers Award-winning albums